Avraham "Avi" Tikva (born 28 June 1976) is a retired Israeli professional association footballer. He is the younger brother of former professional footballer Shalom Tikva.

Biography

Playing career 
During the UEFA Cup 1998–99 season with Grasshopper, Tikva was allowed to miss the match against Belgian side Anderlecht in order to observe the Jewish holiday of Yom Kippur.

Honours 
Swiss National League A:
Winner (1): 1997–98
Runner-up (1): 1998–99
Swiss Cup:
Runner-up (1): 1999
Toto Cup:
Winner (1): 2003–04

Footnotes

External links

1976 births
Living people
Israeli Jews
Israeli footballers
Israel under-21 international footballers
Israel international footballers
Association football midfielders
Israeli expatriate footballers
Maccabi Netanya F.C. players
Hapoel Kfar Saba F.C. players
Bnei Yehuda Tel Aviv F.C. players
Grasshopper Club Zürich players
Hapoel Tel Aviv F.C. players
BSC Young Boys players
Maccabi Petah Tikva F.C. players
Enosis Neon Paralimni FC players
Hakoah Maccabi Amidar Ramat Gan F.C. players
Liga Leumit players
Israeli Premier League players
Swiss Super League players
Cypriot First Division players
Expatriate footballers in Switzerland
Expatriate footballers in Cyprus
Israeli expatriate sportspeople in Switzerland
Israeli expatriate sportspeople in Cyprus
Footballers from Netanya